Ego Trip's The (White) Rapper Show is an American reality television series created by Ego Trip magazine that first aired on VH1. In the show, ten white rappers compete with each other for the chance at a $100,000 grand prize. The show is based in the South Bronx, with MC Serch (from the group 3rd Bass) serving as the host. At the end of each show, one rapper was eliminated.

Each episode followed a different theme in hip hop culture and music, evolving the contestants from wannabe white rappers to full-fledged and multi-faceted hip hop acts.

Episode Progress

 The contestant won the competition
 The contestant was the runner-up.
 The contestant was safe.
 The contestant won the challenge but put up for elimination.
 The contestant was eliminated
 The contestant won the challenge.
 The contestant was up for elimination.
 The contestant quit the competition.

Episodes

Episode 1
The first episode details the casting audition; out of all of the rappers that show up, ten are chosen: Dasit, Jon Boy, Misfit, Sullee, Persia, John Brown, 100 Proof, Jus Rhyme, and G-Child. The 10 chosen are then introduced to their new home in the South Bronx, "Tha White House," which has been designed and furnished to "keep the true essence of hip hop," as opposed to a typical, lavishly designed and furnished reality show house. Early on, trouble brews between John Brown and Persia. Due to John Brown's vague talk about a "ghetto revival" and his claims of his status as "King of the 'Burbs," and due to her pent up frustration, she challenges him to a freestyle battle, which John Brown seems hesitant to do. Sullee enters the fray, as well, but Persia restrains him. Next, she grabs her dildo and shoves it in John Brown's face.

The next day, because of her constant use of the word "nigga" during the altercation, she has to wear an exceptionally large and heavy "N-Word chain" for 24 hours, while the cast goes to a miniature golf course. While leaving the golf course, Persia breaks down, claiming that she "made herself look like an idiot," and she learned her lesson.

The next day, the cast is split into two teams: one group consists of Misfit, Dasit, 100 Proof, Jon Boy, and John Brown as captain; the other has , Sullee, Jus Rhyme, G-Child, and Persia as captain. Persia's team receives good reviews on their rapping skills by their neighbors in the South Bronx, but John Brown's team does not.

The team who lost the "Meet the Neighbors" challenge is sent to elimination. At elimination, where contestants are supposed to write a verse about their experiences that day, Dasit is eliminated because he did not prepare a verse; when asked why, he claims that "he likes to hear music" when writing songs, and he also criticized the challenge which demanded he write a rhyme in time for the elimination. An infuriated MC Serch tells him off for his lack of effort and announces his elimination. He then hands in his sneakers and MC Serch throws them over a clothesline. As Dasit leaves the house he is ambushed by someone costumed as a giant cockroach wielding a large can of "Step Off!" spray that, "Eliminates Wackness with Quickness."

Episode 2
After Dasit's exit, the others wonder why he refused to write a rap for the previous elimination round. Meanwhile, Sullee and Misfit strike up a flirtation.

A jail bus arrives to take the white rappers to meet hip hop pioneers such as Fabel, from the Zulu Nation, and Kurtis Blow, one of the first mainstream rap artists. The rappers are offered the opportunity to dance, but only Jus Rhyme, G-Child, and Sullee dance; while none necessarily excels at their breakdance attempts, all of the rappers feel that Jus Rhyme did particularly bad, with one rapper noting he "looked like he was trying to dance bad on purpose." After they meet Fabel and Kurtis Blow, the rappers are brought to a church, where they are tested on their rap trivia knowledge, in a "Name That Tune" style competition called "U Betta Recognize." Persia, 100 Proof, and John Brown make it to the final round, but 100 Proof wins, which earns him a "ghetto pass," excusing him from elimination activities.

The other eight participants are split into two groups and told to create a group rap on the topic of respect. G-Child's group encourages her to feel confident and participate. In the other group, Misfit disappears for a while, while the other three write lyrics. Grandmaster Caz helps MC Serch judge the competition. While the judges agree that both presentations are good, Grandmaster Caz voices his objections over the first group's use of profanity, which he deems "not necessary," and G-Child, Jon Boy, Jus Rhyme, and  win the competition.

In the morning, the competitors receive a "Mayo" (video mail) message from MC Serch, hinting that they will battle their own worst enemy — themselves. The rappers facing elimination begin thinking about what they can say to make fun of themselves, with the exception of Misfit, who says she has "plenty of stuff" to say about herself, but none of it bad.

At the elimination competition, Persia, Misfit, John Brown, and Sullee are put in the "Ice Ice Chamber" to write their self-deprecating raps. After 30 minutes, they emerge. Sullee goes first and delivers a light-hearted self-attack, even poking fun at how he "slept with Misfit for three nights but didn't seal the deal." John Brown mentions each of his catch phrases ("ghetto revival," "hallelujah hollaback," etc.), and makes fun of it. Persia's rap starts off well, but she forgets the end and gives up. Misfit's rap is not actually self-deprecating, and contains many of the same ideas as her other raps.

MC Serch and Prince Paul deliberate. They agree that Sullee's rap was excellent and clever; John Brown's rap was unexpectedly self-deprecating, but not that interesting otherwise; Persia started well, but lost points by giving up; and that Misfit seemed to be resting on her laurels and not really following the rules. For that reason, they decide to eliminate Misfit, a decision which MC Serch says "hurts [his] heart a little."

Misfit hands over her sneakers and MC Serch throws them over the clothesline, saying, "Sorry, Sullee, [but] you're not gonna get to close the deal."

As Misfit leaves the house, she is stopped by a Nuyorican popsicle vendor and is given a popsicle by a group of girls, who tell her to "Step off!" Then, Misfit bites into the popsicle and the screen shatters into frozen pieces.

Episode 3
In the morning, the rappers get a Mayo-mail, in which Serch tells them that they look terrible and so he's arranged for them to go a barber shop to get cleaned up. G-Child claims that she's been feeling sick, vomiting and feverish, and decides to stay home. At the barber shop, the white rappers attempt to win over the customers, with varying degrees of success.

, G-Child, Sullee, and 100 Proof now face elimination. For the elimination challenge, each rapper selects a slice of bread from the "white loaf," each with a somewhat different topic: Sullee gets "white power"; G-Child gets "white trash"; 100 Proof gets "whitewash," and  gets "white guilt." They go to the Ice Ice Chamber to write their raps, and return 30 minutes later to perform them.

Afterward, Serch and Prince Paul confer to discuss the performance and who should be cut. They agree that 100 Proof's flow and energy was great (though his rhymes are too simple); that G-Child's performance was too halting, reminiscent of Vanilla Ice's style; that  was intense, heart-felt and "tremendous"; and that Sullee very much let them down because he completely forgot half his rap for several moments. It comes down to Sullee and G-Child. Sullee says he should stay in the house because he's "hungry," even though he made some mistakes. G-Child says that whatever will be, will be — but that she thinks she can win and wants to win. Serch tells Sullee that he was a disappointment, but then reveals that G-Child is eliminated. She hands in her sneakers, hugging Serch before she leaves. Serch tosses her shoes up on the clothesline, saying, "Alright, G-Child, be easy."

The show fades out with a shot of G-Child on a milk box (labeled with "Sour Milk" and "You Ain't Fresh"), as if she's a lost child.

Episode 4
This episode starts with a closer view into Jus Rhyme's white-deprecating personality.

The teams are to come up with some lyrics to record in a professional studio. While planning their performance, Sullee and 100 Proof break out the liquor to loosen their nerves. They later travel to the studio in Manhattan where the audio will be mastered by producer Just Blaze and his associates, DJ Nastee and Ryan West. Each team is allocated two hours to record a song. During the recording session, the white rappers are continuing to show their disinterest in Jus Rhyme's unique perspective on things. Persia later describes him as "an odd soul." During the recording,  hears himself on a sour note and appears surprised at himself. The red team ends their record with a shout-out from Just Blaze. The results of the competition will be determined later when the recordings are played at a local club.

After the recording session, the members of La Coka Nostra come by Tha White House to chill out with the white rappers. They share experiences of being white rappers with the competitors.

The white rappers awaken and are soon met by MC Serch to take the white rappers to a local New York strip club called Sin City. The winner of the recording competition will be determined by how well two strippers dance to each team's song. Kool Keith, whose songs usually pertain to strippers and strip clubs, is there to help in the judging of the competition. When the dancing starts to the blue team's song, Sullee and  begin tossing dollar bills at the strippers. The red team was criticized for "rapping separately" and lacking unison. The blue team was criticized for being too choppy. The red team wins and they were awarded with lap dances.

The next day starts out with a scene of 100 Proof peeing in the sink after a long night of drinking. The rappers have "Mayo" — the blue team is facing elimination. Prince Paul is assisting in judging the elimination challenge. The blue team blindly grabs objects from the Mayo jar and is asked to put them on their heads. The objects are G-strings with a word on them. 's word is "Ballers," Sullee's is "Booze," and 100 Proof's is "Broads." The contestants are to make a verse about their words in the Ice Ice Chamber. Sullee stumbles again with a blank. The suspense continues when 100 Proof also hits a blank. 100 Proof is given criticism for being redundant and not modern. Sullee is criticized for stumbling again. In the end, 100 Proof is asked to step off.

The exit scene contains the same "step off" roach from the first episode as well as a damsel in distress hiding behind 100 Proof while the roach is chasing her. During the episode, the same roach (someone in a costume) can be seen enjoying the club, as a young woman smiles at it graciously and counts a large amount of money in her hands.

Episode 5
This episode gets started right away with a fashion-themed challenge. After a meeting with fashion entrepreneur Marc Ecko the contestants are asked to go shopping and put together the most stylish look. The contestants are split into two teams. The contest will be judged by Marc Ecko.

Again, Jus Rhyme annoys his teammates with his incompatible style. Team one names their theme "Gangsta's Paradise," while team two name themselves "Grown-Ass Men." After all of the shopping is done, Jon Boy puts on a gratuitous exhibition of his rhymes in front of a seemingly unimpressed crowd.

Later, over dinner, the contestants discuss their disapproval of Jon Boy's "public appearance" on the street.

The teams gets in "Tha Vans" and go to the fashion show. Upon arrival, they see that Kwamé is there to help judge. The contestants are surprised to see that they won't be modeling their clothes, but a bunch of well-behaved dogs — as in a dog show. Persia wins the contest for her team with her use of matching red pumps on her dog. Sullee is immediately faced with a realization that he'll be up for elimination for the third time in a row. He's not at all happy about the situation.

Upon returning to Tha White House, the contestants are presented with a second challenge. The teams are given some CDs and asked to study and plan that night, and shoot a music video with some stylish and some not so stylish props. After the teams select their props, MC Serch rolls out an enormous, rattling animal cage, covered by a red sheet and containing Bushwick Bill (of the Geto Boys) wearing a Hannibal Lecter mask. MC Serch announces that Bushwick Bill will be helping team one to make their video.

Some candid footage shows that Grown-Ass Men (John Brown, Jon Boy, and Sullee) are not working well together and are having some trouble showing their creativity with each other. The teams begin recording the audio of their videos with sound engineer, Frankyee. In the studio, Grown-Ass Men are again showing their creative differences. Meanwhile, Gangsta's Paradise (Persia, Jus Rhyme, and ) is having a great time making their recording.

For the video recording phase, Choke shows up to direct Gangsta's Paradise, and Israel shows up to direct Grown-Ass Men. Gangsta's Paradise has the advantage of Bushwick Bill's guest appearance, but also has to use elderly women in their video. Meanwhile, Grown-Ass Men are taking full advantage of the young ladies in their video.

After the teams finish the videos, they get a “Mayo” message about the judging of the videos. Little X is coming to judge. Grown-Ass Men presents their video called “She's a Stunner,” and Gangsta's Paradise presents their video called “Old School Music.” Little X criticizes Grown-Ass Men for using typical elements and falling into the hip hop "trap." MC Serch criticizes Gangsta's Paradise for being “too cheesy” and criticizes Grown-Ass Men for putting together a mediocre video. Nevertheless, Gangsta's Paradise is declared the winner.

MC Serch demands an explanation for Grown Ass Men and their poor performance, but is frustrated by their vague and evasive answers. Accordingly, the challenge for the losing team is go in the Ice Ice Chamber and write 16 bars about the flaws of their other team members. MC Serch warns them that he will eliminate all of them if they all come out "soft." The interviews show that none of the team is happy about the latest challenge: None of them wants to be a “snitch.”

For the elimination challenge, Sullee insists on reading his rhymes, during which he concedes and kicks off his sneakers mid-verse. MC Serch criticizes his decision, accusing him of being "caught up in the hip-hop hype" about snitching, and throwing away the chance of a life time on a phony moral ground. After giving him a second chance, MC Serch politely dismisses Sullee from the competition. Jon Boy raps but his verses are about taking personal responsibility for the team's loss and refusing to criticize his team members. John Brown is the only one who raps about his team members' flaws. Despite Sullee quitting, Jon Boy is also eliminated for not fulfilling the challenge. Despite not going as hard as MC Serch instructed, John Brown is allowed to remain for actually following through on the challenge.

After seeing two pairs of shoes being hanged, the exit scene shows the roach directing a scene yelling  into a megaphone as a bikini-clad girl says, “It's a wrap!” and smacks a clapper-board with the words "Step off!" shut.

Episode 6
The overarching theme of the episode is "thugism." In beginning of Episode 6, the four remaining rappers appeared on the Miss Jones in the Morning radio show on New York hip-hop station "Hot 97". The rappers introduced themselves, and got a chance to freestyle. Listeners called in and said that the rappers would not make it in New York. During this event, a comment that John Brown made in reference to Clear Channel Communications gets him thrown out of the room; Miss Jones later explains that Hot 97 was, at the time, in a legal dispute with Clear Channel, who owns rival New York hip-hop station "Power 105.1". After the interview, mainly due to John Brown's comments, Persia reignites her rivalry with John Brown, blaming most of the embarrassment of the interview on him. Later on,  also questions John Brown's authenticity; he claims that Brown acts like a "robot," mainly due to Brown's "ghetto revival" statements and choosing not to open up to his roommates.

Later in the episode, a fashion designer came and fitted the rappers with "thug" clothing that he felt represented the areas where the rappers were from.  comments on the irony pertaining to the clothes that he was given: He, initially, wore long shorts and a black shirt, and ended up with, basically, long shorts and a black shirt, albeit with the small addition of a bandanna and hat.

The remaining four rappers were faced with a "thug challenge" obstacle course. They had to catch three bags in a shopping cart (catch a case); run it (push weight) to a (rat) piñata; destroy it and collect two dollars worth of (drop dime) dimes; run the dimes to a store and exchange for lock cutters; steal (boost) a bike; and return to Tha White House. Jus Rhyme won this challenge.

During this challenge, Persia experienced difficulties in breathing. After the challenge, she was found unconscious in the bathroom. An ambulance took her to the hospital. After being told she was simply dehydrated, Persia left the hospital on her own.

Since Jus Rhyme won the previous challenge, he was invited to have a dinner with hip hop and reggaeton star, N.O.R.E. He was allowed to pick one fellow contestant to go with him; he chooses John Brown. While the two are away,  and Persia comment on how absurd a dinner with the "King of the 'Burbs," a completely "non-thug" rapper, and N.O.R.E. would actually be. At the dinner, N.O.R.E. appears to leave early. However, Jus Rhyme explained in his exit interview with VH1 that N.O.R.E. had been waiting for over an hour and a half for him and Brown and had an engagement he needed to get to within a half-hour of their arriving.

At elimination, all four rappers were required to participate. The theme of the rap was "thug" versions of old nursery rhymes. They picked crayons out of a "Thugola" crayon box to determine which rhyme they had to base off. When the rappers went to perform, Persia stumbled on her rhyme halfway through. After everyone went, MC Serch told her to get back up and try again, but she refused.

During Serch and Prince Paul's discussion of who should be eliminated, both agreed that Jus Rhyme's verse was horrible and embarrassing, and that he was merely attempting to be a thug when he really wasn't. When discussing Persia, Prince Paul made mention of her stumbling under pressure, while Serch stated that the ten lyrics that she did recite were far superior to anything that Jus Rhyme had said.

When they go back to the rappers and are about to announce who will be eliminated, Serch comments that Persia's rhymes, before her stumble, "crushed" Jus Rhyme's. However, Persia ends up being eliminated because she would not try to continue her rap, and she leaves Tha White House in tears.

Persia leaves in the back seat of an undercover police cruiser, after being told that she's held down the block for long enough, in her exit scene. The license plate of the car says "STEP OFF."

Episode 7
John Brown, and Jus Rhyme are the last three left in the house, and the tension seems crazier as they prepare for their next challenge. MC Serch enters the house and tells the three to pack their bags because they are going to Detroit, "The Mecca of White Rap" (a tongue-in-cheek reference to the city being the birthplace of white acts Kid Rock,
Insane Clown Posse, and Eminem). But before they leave, Jus Rhyme gets bad news: He lost his fellowship at the University of Southern California for his Ph.D. in Ethnic Studies due to being on the show.

Upon arriving in Detroit, the three meet up with Serch, who introduces them to their temporary home — a trailer appropriately named "the House of D," (which wasn't really in the inner city of Detroit). He also tells the trio what their next elimination challenge will be: a battle. He explains that the three will be at a distinct disadvantage participating in a battle as a white "foreigner," so Serch gives the three the opportunity to quickly practice their battle rhymes on him.  is having trouble coming up with a rap, admitting that he doesn't freestyle. Serch offers each contestant advice, telling them to stay on their game, not try to make a song (John Brown), and make sure the people get what you're saying by keeping with a distinct rhyme pattern (Jus Rhyme).

After settling in, Serch takes the group to Detroit's legendary Hip Hop Shop, where they learn about the early Detroit scene. The group later meet up with Insane Clown Posse at their Royal Oak headquarters and Kid Rock in his Clarkston, Michigan home. Both discuss growing up in suburbia as well as Detroit, as well as having to deal with being the white kid in a predominantly black city.

Next up for the three is a challenge entitled "Marshall's Law" based on the contestants' knowledge of Eminem's responses given in various interviews. The first contestant to answer eight multiple choice questions correctly, advancing one space (Mile) along a game board from 1 to 8 Mile, wins the game. John Brown wins the challenge and the prize — accommodations at the five-star Royal Park Hotel in Rochester, Michigan. While  and John Brown are enjoying the lavish treatment of the "baller suite," Jus Rhyme writes and practices his battle raps for the next day's elimination.

The next day, Serch brings Jus Rhyme, and John Brown to the legendary Shelter in the basement of St. Andrews Hall, the inspiration for the film 8 Mile. Each of the three chooses an elite Detroit battle rapper to go against.  battled against Bareda. He was able to get in a few insults but stumbled, unable to continue in the second round of his battle. Jus Rhyme battled against La Peace. John Brown got in the most punchlines but also got crushed the worst by Detroit rap legend Lo Louis from the Cardiboys. After deliberating with their opponents, Serch chooses to eliminate Jus Rhyme. He vows to continue working towards his Ph.D., despite losing his fellowship grant, and continuing with his group, AR-15. His shoes are "thrown from Detroit," where they land on the wire back in the Bronx.

Jus Rhyme walks out of The Shelter in shame and is left with a message from Kid Rock telling him to "step off." In a pre-recorded clip, Kid Rock hits a billiard 8-ball, which appears to crush Jus Rhyme — the ball has the number "8" replaced with "step off."

During commercial breaks, VH-1 included Behind the Music footage of Persia, which revealed that she was able to secure a record deal since leaving the show.

Episode 8
After eight eliminations, only John Brown and  remain in the competition for $100,000. Serch tells the two that the final challenge will involve performance. But before the two can perform, they must prepare.

Fat Joe visits the two rappers and gives them a pep talk about performance. He tells them to feel and enjoy what they do. Serch then gives  and John Brown an opportunity to practice: They are going to perform at halftime of a basketball game at Harlem's Rucker Park.

Later, as he is rapping, his grill becomes loose in his mouth and he nearly swallows and chokes on the mouthpiece. Later, Serch gives critiques on the rappers, stating that while John Brown was able to get through his rhyme flawlessly, he was visibly nervous, clutching the mic with both hands as they shook.

Eventually, it's time for the rappers to begin their final challenge: to not only write an entire song (verses, chorus, hook), but to also write a 16-bar verse and be prepared to perform both of them. They are both given CDs of beats and sent to create. While  is excited to see his friend, Black Josh, whom  credits for getting him to actually get out and rap in public, John Brown is less-than excited by his guest, Blaise Delacroix II, who isn't even a member of his "Ghetto Revival" crew. John Brown also says that he is only focused on the task at hand, and has no time for visitors at the time. Eventually, the guests leave, and it's only John Brown and  left to finish their preparations.

The next day,  and John Brown pack up and leave Tha White House for the last time. They are also given a clue as to their final performance: that it's going to be "hell." The two are brought to an unnamed club, where they walk down a series of stairs into the basement. There, R.A. the Rugged Man, dressed in a Satan outfit, is finishing his own set, while "flames" spew.

It's performance time. In front of a capacity crowd and four judges — producer Clinton Sparks, former A&R executive Dante Ross, Prince Paul, and Serch himself — John Brown and  come out to a chorus of applause. Round one of the performance challenge is for the rappers to perform their 16-bar rap. Both make it through their songs without a hitch, but while John Brown is stationary on the stage, combining deft wordplay with a tight flow,  is energetic, playing to the audience and bouncing all over the stage. Round two of the challenge is the performance of the rappers' songs. John Brown performs "Car Wars," a song about how the suburban lifestyle is maintained by taking resources from other countries. 's song is called "Fly Away," a song telling haters to leave him alone and let him do his thing. Once again, both rappers successfully perform their songs in their own way, with a stationary John Brown reciting clever lyrics, while  energizes the crowd.

The judges convene and discuss the two performances. While John Brown had superior lyrics to the "been-done-before" , he appeared nervous. Dante Ross maintains that current mainstream rap music isn't about lyricism; "it's about making good records;"  was able to work the crowd much better and make that "hot" song.  is chosen as the winner, and is told by Serch to "Step Up!"  receives a large trophy and states that his winnings will be going towards repaying Black Josh for paying $ham's rent while he was away, and also taking care of his parents and his sister who was starting college.

The epilogue shows John Brown leaving the club when R.A. the Rugged Man begins chasing him with the can of "Step Off!" spray that was seen in the first episode.

External links
 
 The (White) Rapper Show – Official Website
 Audio interview with Brent Rollins and Gabriel Alvarez on public radio program The Sound of Young America
 Elliott Wilson (show producer) interview 
 John Brown Interview

2000s American reality television series
VH1 original programming
English-language television shows
2007 American television series debuts
2007 American television series endings
Hip hop television